All Saints Eve is a horror film directed by Gerry Lively. The film stars Sean Whalen, Marc Macaulay, Katrina Darrell and Bingo O'Malley. It also stars Nick LaMantia and Mere Davis. The film's writer and producer was Elizabeth Rossi.

Premise
An old curse came about as a result of a murder that took place in the 1800s over some land that was wanted. A preacher leading mob of angry parishioners  murdered a farmer and his family. Now in the present time, there are a group of friends have to stay alive in order to discover what has caused the curse. They must do this before they themselves fall victim.

Review
The film is not overly gory but is along the lines of some of the earlier slasher-type films.

References

External links
 

American supernatural horror films
2015 horror films
Supernatural slasher films
2010s English-language films
Films directed by Gerry Lively
2010s American films